Xuanhua North railway station is a railway station in People's Republic of China.

See also
Xuanhua railway station

References

Stations on the Beijing–Zhangjiakou Intercity Railway
Railway stations in Hebei
Railway stations in China opened in 2019
Xuanhua